During the closing ceremony of the 2016 Summer Olympics in Rio de Janeiro, the flag bearers of 207 National Olympic Committees (NOCs) arrived into Maracanã Stadium. The flags of each country were not necessarily carried by the same flag bearer as in the opening ceremony.

Countries and flagbearers
The following is a list of each country's flag bearer. The list is sorted by the order in which each nation appears in the parade of nations. Names are given as were officially designated by the International Olympic Committee (IOC).

Reference:

References

closing ceremony flag bearers
Lists of Olympic flag bearers